Trimbak Damodar Pustake was  an Indian politician. He was a Member of Parliament  representing Madhya Pradesh in the Rajya Sabha the upper house of India's Parliament as member  of the  Indian National Congress.

References

Rajya Sabha members from Madhya Bharat
Indian National Congress politicians
1889 births
Year of death missing